Fear No Evil is the third album by the American band Slaughter. The record was completed while the band was still signed to Chrysalis Records. It was released in 1995 through CMC International. 

The album peaked at No. 182 on the Billboard 200. A video was made for '"Searchin'". The band supported the album with a North American tour. 

Fear No Evil has sold around 500,000 copies.

Production
Prior to the recording sessions, singer Mark Slaughter was recovering from a 1992 nodule surgery on his vocal cords, guitarist Tim Kelly had been charged with drug trafficking, and bassist Dana Strum was rehabilitating from a motorcycle accident that injured his playing hand. The album title was picked by the band's fans, as part of a contest. The songs were written in 1992 and 1993.

Critical reception

The Sun-Sentinel wrote that "it's pretty much what fans expect, with a few tentative melodies and instrumental breaks thrown in for good measure." The Calgary Herald called the album "textbook '80s thud-rock," and gave it an "E" (in homage to Robert Christgau), for "a record often cited as proof that God does not exist." 

The New Straits Times concluded that "the slam-bangers are ordinary and cliche-ridden but the slower songs, despite having borrowed touches, are rather enjoyable." The Columbus Dispatch dismissed Fear No Evil as "the Chipmunks' tribute to Soundgarden."

AllMusic wrote that Slaughter "never were among the best pop-metal groups, lacking the hooks and charisma to make it to the top, but Fear No Evil shows that they could rock harder than anyone would have expected."

Track listing

Personnel
Mark Slaughter – lead vocals and keyboards
Tim Kelly – guitar
Dana Strum – bass
Blas Elias – drums
A.T Das – guitar
James SK Wān – bamboo flute

References

Slaughter (band) albums
1995 albums
CMC International albums